The London Vickers Viking accident occurred on 2 September 1958 when an Independent Air Travel Vickers VC.1 Viking (registration G-AIJE) with three crew members aboard and loaded with two Bristol Proteus turboprop engines as cargo attempted a flight from London Heathrow Airport to Tel Aviv via Nice, Brindisi and Athens.

Accident
The aircraft took off from Heathrow at 05:54 GMT but minutes into the flight the flight crew reported engine problems and requested a return to Blackbushe Airport. The crew was cleared by Air Traffic Control to descend to 3000 feet, but they were unable to maintain this altitude and continued descending. A Mayday call was made from the aircraft at 06:32 GMT, shortly before it crashed into a row of houses on Kelvin Gardens, Southall, Middlesex.  The aircraft burst into flames on impact, killing all three crew members as well as four people on the ground, a mother and three children. Witnesses reported that they saw one of the crew waving outside of the aircraft just before the aircraft crashed.

Cause
According to the Public inquiry which investigated the accident, the probable cause of the accident was that "the aircraft was allowed to lose height and flying speed with the result that the pilot was no longer able to exercise asymmetric control." While the reasons for the loss of power and the subsequent loss of height and speed were not known, the public inquiry found a number of serious flaws in the operation of Independent Air Travel and the maintenance of the aircraft. Maintenance had been carried out on one of the aircraft propellers at Heathrow on the night before the accident by personnel who were not qualified to carry out the work.  The aircraft was overloaded and the pilot had not had adequate rest, having effectively been on duty for 31 hours 30 minutes compared with the 16 hours required by the regulations (This took advantage of a loophole in regulations that allowed crew to carry out flights during "rest" hours if no passengers or cargo was carried.). Check flights, which should have tested the pilot's ability to handle the aircraft at high weights and with one engine out were found to be "perfunctory" and did not adequately prove the pilot's ability to handle the aircraft with one engine failed.

References

 "Morning Disaster". British Pathe. 4 September 1958. Retrieved 20 March 2010.
 "Air Commerce: The Southall Accident: Report of the Public Inquiry". Flight, 21 August 1959, p. 58.
 "Air Commerce: Southall: The Aftermath". Flight, 28 August 1959. p. 91.
 Vickers 621 Viking 1 G-AIJE London Airport (LHR). Aviation Safety Network. 15 April 2007. Retrieved 20 March 2010.

Aviation accidents and incidents in 1958
Aviation accidents and incidents in London
Airliner accidents and incidents involving controlled flight into terrain
Accidents and incidents involving the Vickers VC.1 Viking
1958 in London
Southall
September 1958 events in the United Kingdom
20th century in Middlesex
Disasters in Middlesex
1958 disasters in the United Kingdom
History of the London Borough of Ealing
Airliner accidents and incidents in the United Kingdom